Ana Gloria Hernández Álvarez (born November 10, 1962) is a retired female basketball player from Cuba. She competed for her native country at the 1992 Summer Olympics, finishing in fourth place with the Women's National Team.

References
 

1962 births
Living people
Cuban women's basketball players
Basketball players at the 1992 Summer Olympics
Olympic basketball players of Cuba